Magomed Shotaevich Shataev (1896 −1965) was a Chechen public figure of the Soviet period.

In the Civil War of 1917—1923, Shataev took part in a hundred day battles for Grozny and the capture of the Vedeno fortress. Later, in administrative and political work in the ChAO, CHI AO and CHI ASSR, during the Great Purge in 1937—1941 he was accused of organizing an armed uprising, was sentenced to death. The sentence was eventually commuted to imprisonment, Shataev was sent to Stalinist camps and tortured. In 1944 he was deported from the Caucasus. In the period after WWII he actively worked on the rehabilitation of the Vainakhs and their return from deportation to their historical homeland, and also sought the restoration of the ChI ASSR. In 1956, Shataev was a member of the delegation from the Vainakhs to Moscow to the members of the Presidium of the Central Committee of the CPSU, which resulted in the creation by the government of the Commission for the Restoration of the Chechen-Ingush Autonomous Soviet Socialist Republic. He became the first of the Chechens to achieve a mandate allowing them to visit their homeland after deportation. In his youth, he was friends with Abdurakhman Avtorkhanov and was his colleague. After the collapse of the USSR in the early 1990s, A. Avtorkhanov often mentioned Magomed in his radio interviews as his friend.

Memory 
In honor of Shataev, one of the streets in the city of Kurchaloy was named.

References

Further reading 
 Батукаева З. А. Тайны семейного архива братьев Налаевых // «Маршо». — 2010. — № 13—14 (5 февраля).
 
 
 
 Chechen-Ingush ASSR list of persons subject to trial by the military collegium of the Supreme Court of the USSR of September 12, 1938 Stalin, Molotov, Zhdanov. РГАСПИ, ф.17, оп.171, дело 418, лист 49.

1896 births
1965 deaths
Chechen politicians
People from Chechnya
People from Terek Oblast